Celebration is a compilation album by Simple Minds, released in 1982. The compilation features tracks from the band's first three albums released during their tenure on the Arista Records label, prior to their move to Virgin Records in 1981. One of the tracks, "Kaleidoscope", was exclusive to this CD and LP until it appeared on the X5 box set in 2012.

Track listing

Notes

Personnel 
Simple Minds
 Charlie Burchill – guitar, vocals
 Derek Forbes – bass, vocals
 Jim Kerr – vocals
 Mick MacNeil – keyboards, vocals
 Brian McGee – drums, vocals
Technical
 John Leckie – producer
 Thomi Wroblewski – sleeve design, photo illustration

Chart positions

References

External links

1982 compilation albums
Simple Minds compilation albums
Arista Records compilation albums